The 221st Coastal Division was an infantry division of the Royal Italian Army during World War II. Royal Italian Army coastal divisions were second line divisions formed with reservists and equipped with second rate materiel. They were often commanded by officers called out of retirement.

History 
The division was activated on 15 April 1942 in Latina by uniting the two coastal defense sectors "Littoria" and "Gaeta". The division was assigned to XVII Army Corps and based its headquarter in Pontinia. The division was responsible for the coastal defense of the coast of southern Lazio between the rivers Astura and Garigliano.

After the announcement of the Armistice of Cassibile on 8 September 1943 the division was disbanded by invading German forces.

Organization 
 221st Coastal Division, in Pontinia
 4th Coastal Regiment
 3x Coastal battalions
 8th Coastal Regiment
 3x Coastal battalions
 II Dismounted Squadrons Group/ Regiment "Savoia Cavalleria"
 221st Carabinieri Section
 Field Post Office
 Division Services

If needed the artillery for the division would come from the following artillery schools located within the division's area of responsibility:
 Artillery School, in Sabaudia
 Coastal Artillery School, in Torre Olevola
 Maritime Artillery School, in Gaeta

Commanding officers 
The division's commanding officers were:

 Generale di Brigata Edoardo Minaja (15 April 1942 - September 1943)

References 

 
 

Coastal divisions of Italy
Infantry divisions of Italy in World War II